Catocala clintoni,  Clinton's underwing, is a moth of the family Erebidae. It is found from Ontario and Quebec, southward to Florida, west to Texas and north to Wisconsin.

The wingspan is 45–55 mm. Adults are on wing from February to July depending on the location. There is probably one generation per year.

The larvae feed on Crataegus, Gleditsia triacanthos, Malus pumila, Prunus americana, Prunus ilicifolia and Ulmus.

References

External links
Species info

Moths described in 1864
clintoni
Moths of North America